Necydalinae is a small subfamily of the longhorn beetle family (Cerambycidae), historically treated as a tribe within the subfamily Lepturinae, but recently recognized as a separate subfamily. These beetles are unusual for cerambycids, in that the elytra are quite short; they are thus rather similar in appearance to rove beetles, though most are actually bee or wasp mimics.

Genera

References

External links
 M.Rejzek and M.Hoskovec.Webpage on Necydalis ulmi.

 
Cerambycidae
Beetle subfamilies